The 1953–54 SK Rapid Wien season was the 56th season in club history.

Squad

Squad and statistics

Squad statistics

Fixtures and results

League

References

1953-54 Rapid Wien Season
Rapid
Austrian football championship-winning seasons